Sarah-Jayne Mulvihill (née Poole; 10 June 1973 – 6 May 2006) was a flight lieutenant in the Royal Air Force (RAF) who died in Iraq, becoming the first British servicewoman to be killed in action for more than 20 years.

Born Sarah-Jayne Poole in Canterbury, Kent, she joined the RAF as an airwoman in May 1997. Sarah-Jayne Mulvihill was selected for officer training in October 2001. She graduated from the RAF College Cranwell in April 2002 and was commissioned into the Air Traffic Control Branch. She changed branch in 2003 and after completing Flight Operations Officer Training she was posted to RAF Northolt.

In May 2005 she was posted to RAF Benson, Oxfordshire as the Flight Operations Officer with No. 28 (Army Cooperation) Squadron, from where she was detached to Iraq. Married to another serving member of the RAF, Lee Mulvihill, she was on her second deployment to Iraq. She died with four other members of a flight crew when their Lynx helicopter was shot down over Basra in southern Iraq.

She was 32 years old at the time of her death, and is survived by her parents, her brother and her husband.

References

External links
 
 

1973 births
2006 deaths
Royal Air Force officers
Women in the Royal Air Force
People from Canterbury
Graduates of the Royal Air Force College Cranwell
Women in 21st-century warfare
Royal Air Force personnel of the Iraq War
British military personnel killed in action in the Iraq War
Royal Air Force airmen
Aviators killed by being shot down